Southern Wake Montessori School was a collaborative, not-for-profit community of children, their families and teachers located in Holly Springs, NC. 

Southern Wake Montessori School (SWMS) closed for business July 24, 2009.

See also 
Montessori
Maria Montessori
Wake County
Southern Wake Montessori School Website

External links 
Southern Wake Montessori School (SWMS)
American Montessori Society

Defunct schools in North Carolina